An election was held on Tuesday, November 6, 2018, to elect the non-voting delegate to the United States House of Representatives from American Samoa's at-large congressional district. The election coincided with the midterm elections for other federal and territorial offices, including the larger American Samoa general election, as well as the nationwide 2018 United States House of Representatives elections and the 2018 United States general elections. 

Incumbent delegate Amata Coleman Radewagen, a Republican who had held the seat since 2015, won re-election to the United States House of Representatives for a third term.

Background
In November 2014, Amata Coleman Radewagen defeated 10-term incumbent Democratic Rep. Eni Faleomavaega in a crowded race for the seat. She won re-election to a second term in 2016.

Candidates
The deadline for candidates to file with the Election Office was September 1, 2018. Three candidates filed to run for election to American Samoa's lone seat in the United States House of Representatives by the deadline.

Democratic
Meleagi Suitonu-Chapman, retired U.S. federal government employee

Independents
Tuika Tuika, accountant, civil servant and politician, former candidate for Governor of American Samoa (2008, 2016)

Republican
Amata Coleman Radewagen, incumbent Delegate for the United States House of Representatives

General election results

References

United States House of Representatives
American Samoa
2018
2018
November 2018 events in Oceania